The Slovakia national korfball team is managed by the Slovak Korfball Association (SAK), representing Slovakia in korfball international competitions.

In 2007 Slovakia won the European Bowl and in 2009, the European Bowl (East).

Tournament history

Current squad
National team in the 2009 European Bowl

 Coach:  Marcel Kavala

References 

National korfball teams
Korfball
National team